Vadarci is a settlement in the Municipality of Puconci in the Prekmurje region of Slovenia.

Notable people
Notable people that were born or lived in Vadarci include:
József Szakovics (1874–1930), writer

References

External links

Vadarci on Geopedia

Populated places in the Municipality of Puconci